The 2011 Spanish motorcycle Grand Prix was the second round of the 2011 Grand Prix motorcycle racing season. It took place on the weekend of 1–3 April 2011 at the Circuito de Jerez located in Jerez de la Frontera, Spain. This was Nicky Hayden's final MotoGP podium finish before he switched to World Superbikes in 2016 and his death in 2017.

MotoGP classification

Moto2 classification

125 cc classification

Championship standings after the race (MotoGP)
Below are the standings for the top five riders and constructors after round two has concluded.

Riders' Championship standings

Constructors' Championship standings

 Note: Only the top five positions are included for both sets of standings.

References

Spanish motorcycle Grand Prix
Spanish
motorcycle
April 2011 sports events in Europe